Gallants (Da lui toi 打擂台) is a 2010 Hong Kong action comedy film directed by Derek Kwok and Clement Cheng, starring Leung Siu-lung, Chen Kuan-tai and Teddy Robin. The film is set in modern times, but is in the style of Hong Kong action comedy films from the 1960s and 1970s. The film premiered at the Hong Kong Film Festival on 26 March 2010. The film has received favourable reviews on its festival shows in North America.

Plot
In modern-day Hong Kong, Leung King-cheung (Wong You-nam) received a job from his real estate company to handle a dispute in a village in the New Territories. Leung arrives and meets with two old martial artists, Tiger (Leung Siu-lung) and Dragon (Chen Kuan-tai), who are being bullied by the young Chung Sang-mang (MC Jin) and his crew. Chung wants Dragon and Tiger to sell their lease on a tea house which was used as a training dojo by their comatose master Law San (Teddy Robin). When Law suddenly wakes up from his 30-year coma, he is determined to restart his school by taking on Chung and his master Pong Ching (Michael Chan).

Production
Gallants is the directoral debut of Clement Cheng and the third film for his friend director Derek Kwok, as well as a production debut of actor Gordon Lam. The film is produced by Andy Lau's Focus Films, with Lau also serving as executive producer.

Gallants was originally conceived as being about a musical group in the 1960s and 1970s. One member suffers a stroke and begins to realise he has not done anything of importance in his life. Feeling that he may die soon, his last wish is to go back to his youth, find all his friends, and do one final show. Finding it difficult to sell the story about musicians, the writers changed the theme of the plot to being about kung fu masters instead. For the cast, Cheng and Kwok felt that if they could not get the actors Chen Kuan-tai and Bruce Leung, they would not make the film.

Gallants was shot in 18 days.

Release
Gallants had its premiere at the Hong Kong International Film Festival on 26 March 2010. It was released in China and Hong Kong on 4 June 2010. Gallants had its North American premiere at the New York Asian Film Festival on 6 July 2010. In Hong Kong, Gallants  was the third highest-grossing film on its opening weekend. It grossed a total of $585,848 on its theatrical run.

Reception
Variety praised the actors in Gallants, noting the charisma of Bruce Leung and Chen Kuan-tai while saying that Teddy Robin "steals the show". Film Business Asia gave Gallants a 6 out of 10 rating, calling it a "Likable but over-loose tribute to Hong Kong martial arts films of the '60s and '70s." The Independent Film Channel gave the film a positive review, noting "This could have been an exercise in cheap nostalgia, and it's not. Taken entirely on its own, it's a wholly entertaining and touching movie about friendship and growing old." The Montreal Gazette gave the film three and a half stars, praising the comedic skills of Bruce Leung and Chen Kuan-tai, stating that Gallant "has plenty of successful gags, if a few that seem a bit too suited for Nickelodeon at prime-time." Now magazine gave the film a four out of five rating, calling it a "very entertaining salute to old legends" comparing the film to Kung Fu Hustle.
Gallants won the awards for best film and best actor (Teddy Robin) at the 17th Hong Kong Film Critics Society Awards. On The 30th Hong Kong Film Awards, held on 17 April 2011, low-budget 'Gallants' won the prestigious 'best movie' award.

Notes

External links

2010 films
2010 action comedy films
2010 martial arts films
Hong Kong action comedy films
Hong Kong martial arts comedy films
2010s martial arts comedy films
Kung fu films
Best Film HKFA
Films set in Hong Kong
Films directed by Derek Kwok
2010s Cantonese-language films
2010s Hong Kong films